This is a list of notable people who studied at the Byam Shaw School of Art from its foundation in 1910 until it was absorbed by Central Saint Martins College of Arts and Design in 2003.

References

Byam Shaw School of Art